Middlewich Town Council is the town council for the Cheshire Market Town of Middlewich and was established in 1974 as a successor council to the Middlewich Urban District Council. The town council meets at Middlewich Town Hall.

References

Town Councils in Cheshire
Local precepting authorities in England
Town Council